Grande Prémio Jornal de Notícias is a multi-day road cycling race held annually in Portugal. It is sponsored by the daily Jornal de Notícias newspaper.

Winners

References

Cycle races in Portugal
Recurring sporting events established in 1979